Bodok or Bödök may refer to:

 Bodok seal, a specialised washer
 210939 Bödök, a minor planet

See also
 Bodoc (disambiguation)